Metropolitan Police is a subnational unit of Bangladesh Police. There are eight unit in eight metropolis area in Bangladesh. This unit was formed in 1976 by establishing of Dhaka Metropolitan Police.

Units
Existing Units
Dhaka Metropolitan Police
Chattogram Metropolitan Police
Rajshahi Metropolitan Police
Khulna Metropolitan Police
Barishal Metropolitan Police
Sylhet Metropolitan Police
Rangpur Metropolitan Police
Gazipur Metropolitan Police
Proposed Units
Cumilla Metropolitan Police
Narayanganj Metropolitan Police
Mymensingh Metropolitan Police
Bogura Metropolitan Police

References

 
Police units of Bangladesh
Municipal law enforcement agencies